Hypera zoilus (syn. H. punctata), commonly known as the clover leaf weevil, is a species of weevil that can be  found in clover fields throughout North America and Europe. It is typically brown and 5–9 mm in length.

References 

Entiminae
Beetles described in 1763
Taxa named by Giovanni Antonio Scopoli